Colonel George de Cardonnel Elmsall Findlay VC MC & Bar (20 August 1889 – 26 June 1967) was a Scottish recipient of the Victoria Cross, the highest and most prestigious award for gallantry in the face of the enemy that can be awarded to British and Commonwealth forces.

Findlay was commissioned into the Royal Engineers in January 1910. He was awarded a Military Cross for gallantry at the Battle of Passchendale after which he took command of 409 (Lowland) Field Company, a territorial company in June 1917.

VC details
He was 29 years old, and an acting major in the 409 (Lowland) Field Company, Corps of Royal Engineers, British Army during the First World War when the following deed took place during the second battle of Sambre for which he was awarded the VC.

On 4 November 1918 during the forcing of the Sambre-Oise Canal at the lock south of Catillon, France, Major Findlay was with the leading bridging and assaulting parties which came under heavy fire and the advance was stopped. Nevertheless, he collected what men he could and repaired the bridge, under incessant fire. Although wounded he continued with his task and after two unsuccessful efforts managed to place the bridge in position across the lock and was the first man across, remaining at this dangerous post until further work was completed. The family story goes that the reason Major Findlay crossed safely was because he was a slow runner. The Germans overcompensated their aim and thus missed him as he led his men across the bridge.

Further information

Findlay was educated at St Ninian's Prep School, Moffat and Harrow School.

He later achieved the rank of colonel and served in World War II. He became Deputy Lieutenant of the County of Dumbarton in 1957.

Findlay is buried at Kilmaronock Church, near Gartocharn, West Dunbartonshire, Scotland in his family plot.

The medal
His Victoria Cross is displayed at the Royal Engineers Museum, Chatham, Kent.

References

Monuments to Courage (David Harvey, 1999)
The Register of the Victoria Cross (This England, 1997)
The Sapper VCs (Gerald Napier, 1998)
Scotland's Forgotten Valour (Graham Ross, 1995)
VCs of the First World War - The Final Days 1918 (Gerald Gliddon, 2000)

External links
Royal Engineers Museum Sappers VCs
Location of grave and VC medal (Strathclyde)

British World War I recipients of the Victoria Cross
Royal Engineers officers
British Army personnel of World War I
British Army personnel of World War II
1889 births
1967 deaths
People educated at St Ninian's School, Moffat
People educated at Harrow School
People from West Dunbartonshire
Deputy Lieutenants of Dunbartonshire
Recipients of the Military Cross
British Army recipients of the Victoria Cross